The 1952 season of the Paraguayan Primera División, the top category of Paraguayan football, was played by 11 teams. The national champions were Presidente Hayes.

Results

Standings

External links
Paraguay 1952 season at RSSSF

Para
Primera
Paraguayan Primera División seasons